Ukrainka is a city in Obukhiv Raion, Kyiv Oblast (province) of Ukraine. It hosts the administration of Ukrainka urban hromada, one of the hromadas of Ukraine. In 2001, the population was 14,163.

Since 2010, Ukrainka hosts the International Video Art and Short Film festival "VAU-Fest", held annually in the summer.

References

External links

 ukrainka.org - Official website of the city of Ukrainka

Cities in Kyiv Oblast
1979 establishments in the Soviet Union
Cities of district significance in Ukraine
Populated places on the Dnieper in Ukraine
Kyiv metropolitan area